Pierrepoint is a 2005 British film directed by Adrian Shergold about the life of British executioner Albert Pierrepoint.

The film premiered at the 2005 Toronto International Film Festival and was released in the UK on 7 April 2006. In the United States, it had a limited theatrical release at three screens on 7 June 2007, grossing $21,766. It was released on DVD on 30 October 2007.

Commissioned as a television film in 2004, Pierrepoint was broadcast on ITV on 25 August 2008, when it attracted an estimated audience of 3.6 million. The film was renamed Pierrepoint: The Last Hangman for its North American release, although Pierrepoint was not the last British hangman.

Premise
The film is loosely based on the life of Britain's most prolific hangman, Albert Pierrepoint (played by Timothy Spall), from the time he is trained for the job and accepted onto the list of the country's official hangmen in 1932 until his resignation in 1956.

Cast
Timothy Spall as Albert Pierrepoint
Juliet Stevenson as Annie Pierrepoint
Eddie Marsan as James "Tish" Corbitt
Ben McKay as Timothy Evans
Michael Norton as Josef Kramer
Lizzie Hopley as Dorothea Waddingham
Cavan Clerkin as George Cooper
Mary Jo Randle as Mrs Corbitt
Christopher Fulford as Charlie Sykes
Ian Shaw as Percy
Ann Bell as Violet Van der Elst
Robin Soans as Governor/Brigadier Paton-Walsh
Nicholas Blane as governor of Strangeways
Maggie Ollerenshaw as Mary Pierrepoint, Albert's mother
Bernard Kay as Uncle Tom
Claire Keelan as Jessie Kelly
Clive Francis as Monty
Sheyla Shehovich as Irma Grese
Keiran Flynn as Neville
Tobias Menzies as Lieutenant Llewellyn
Mary Stockley as Ruth Ellis
James Corden as Kirky

Production

The hanging scenes and the street protest scenes at the end of the film were at the Historic Dockyard, Chatham.

Reception
On review aggregator website Rotten Tomatoes, the film holds an approval rating of 77% based on 53 reviews, with an average rating of 7/10. The site's critical consensus reads, "Director Adrian Shergold doesn't shy away from the darker elements of the movie's subject, and Timothy Spall is mesmerizing as the title character." On Metacritic, the film has a weighted average score of 68 out of 100, based on 15 critics, indicating "generally favourable reviews".

References

External links

Film Festival program note

2005 films
British biographical drama films
2005 biographical drama films
Films about capital punishment
Albert Pierrepoint
Cultural depictions of Ruth Ellis
Films directed by Adrian Shergold
2005 drama films
2000s English-language films
2000s British films